Gianluca Clemente (born 15 April 1996) is an Italian professional footballer who plays as a right-back for  club Pro Vercelli.

Club career 
Coming through the youth sector, Clemente began his career with local club Fano in Serie D. Following a move to Pescara, who promptly loaned him to Macaratese, Clemente joined Grosseto in 2016. In November 2016, Grosseto finalized the sale of Clemente to Fermana.

Clemente moved back to Fano in the last day of the 2019 January transfer window. On 2 September 2019, he joined Carpi on a two-year deal. Clemente returned to Fermana in January 2020, who then sold him to Pro Vercelli on 5 October 2020, in a swap deal with Lorenzo Grossi.

References

External links 
 
 

1996 births
Living people
People from Fano
Sportspeople from the Province of Pesaro and Urbino
Footballers from Marche
Italian footballers
Association football fullbacks
Alma Juventus Fano 1906 players
Delfino Pescara 1936 players
S.S. Maceratese 1922 players
U.S. Grosseto 1912 players
Fermana F.C. players
A.C. Carpi players
F.C. Pro Vercelli 1892 players
Serie D players
Serie C players